The Dakar Grand Mosque is one of the most important religious buildings in Dakar, Senegal. It is situated on Allée Pape Gueye Fall.

History

Designed by Moroccan and French architects, Dakar Grand Mosque was opened in 1964 by Hassan II, King of Morocco and Senegalese President Léopold Sédar Senghor.

Architecture
Richly decorated on the interior and exterior, it is stylistically similar to the Mausoleum of Mohammed V in Casablanca. Its minaret rises to 67 metres.

Islamic Institute of Dakar

Created in 1964 and situated in the enceinte of the Grand Mosque, the Islamic Institute is a public institution under the direction of  the Senegalese Minister of Education, dedicated to Islamic research and teaching.  The library of the Institute, named for prince Naef Ben Abdelaziz Al-Saoud was opened 9 October 2004.

See also
  Lists of mosques 
  List of mosques in Africa
  List of mosques in Egypt
Mosque
Great Mosque of Touba
Islam in Senegal
Religion in Senegal

References

 Portions of this article were translated from the French Wikipedia article Grande Mosquée de Dakar, retrieved 2008-02-15.
Charles-Babacar Seck, La Grande Mosquée de Dakar, suivie d'une étude sur l'Islam au Sénegal, 1966

External links

A la découverte d'une ville du monde : Dakar (TV5)
Site de l'Institut islamique de Dakar

1964 establishments in Senegal
Buildings and structures in Dakar
Mosques in Senegal
Mosques completed in 1964